Socialist League may refer to one of several organisations: 

Socialist League (Australia)
Socialist League (Canada)
Socialist League (Finland)
Socialist League (Germany)
Socialist League (Italy)
Socialist League (Sweden)
Socialist League (Venezuela)
Socialist League (UK, 1885), a split from the Social Democratic Federation associated with William Morris
Socialist League (UK, 1932), a split from the Independent Labour Party associated with Stafford Cripps
Socialist Action (UK), founded 1982, originally officially known as the Socialist League
Socialist League of Palestine

Political party disambiguation pages